{{Infobox person
| name               = Jason Done
| image              = 
| caption            = 
| birth_date         = 
| birth_place        = Walkden, Lancashire, England
| occupation         = Actor
| years_active       = 1981–present
| television         = Where the Heart Is (1999–2001) Waterloo Road (2006–2013)Can't Pay? We'll Take It Away!Monsters Inside Me (2022)
}}

Jason Done (born 5 April 1973) is an English actor who appeared as Mordred in the 1998 TV miniseries Merlin, opposite Sam Neill. He is best known for his role as Stephen Snow in ITV drama Where The Heart Is from 1999 to 2001 and Tom Clarkson in the BBC One school-based drama series, Waterloo Road, from 2006 to 2013.

Career
Where The Heart Is
Done appeared as Stephen Snow in the ITV drama series Where The Heart Is, taking over the part in series 3 from William Ash, in 1999. Stephen Snow was the son of Peggy Snow (Pam Ferris) and Vic Snow (Tony Haygarth). Done portrayed Stephen throughout Series 3, Series 4 and part of Series 5, during which the character left the fictional town of Skelthwaite.

Waterloo Road
On 9 March 2006, Done began appearing as English teacher, Tom Clarkson, in the successful BBC One school-based drama series, Waterloo Road. On 10 April 2013, it was announced that Done would be leaving his role as Tom after seven years and eight series. Tom left the series in the final episode of the eighth series, on 4 July 2013, in a shock twist which saw Tom fall from the school roof after helping troubled pupil, Kyle Stack (George Sampson), from committing suicide. Done is the second longest serving cast member.

Theatre
Done later appeared in a travelling production of Macbeth, which was held at the Royal Exchange Theatre, in Manchester.

Television
In May 2014, Done appeared as Andrew Wendell in Casualty and in October 2014 as Paul Brightway in the story "The Lions of Nemea", part of series 8 of the ITV drama series Lewis. He also started in Closets, a short film. On 7 February 2016, Done appeared in the TV series Vera. In 2016, he appeared in the ITV/Netflix series Paranoid. Coronation Street 2017

Narration
Done narrated the BBC Three documentary series Junior Doctors: Your Life in Their Hands, its 2014 spin-off Junior Paramedics, the BBC TV series Hair, the BBC series Emergency Rescue Down Under and the Channel 5 documentaries Can't Pay We'll Take It Away, Inside Kings Cross: The Railway and Paddington Station 24/7 along with Ice Lake Rebels & the UK narration to Monsters Inside Me.

Filmography

References

External links

1973 births
English male television actors
Living people
People from Walkden
Alumni of the University of Salford
People educated at Walkden High School
20th-century English male actors
21st-century English male actors
Male actors from Salford